Corambe steinbergae is a species of sea slug, an Eastern Pacific Ocean nudibranch, a marine, opisthobranch gastropod mollusk in the family Corambidae.

This species feeds on bryozoans.

Distribution
This marine species occurs in the Northeastern Pacific from Alaska to Baja California, Mexico.

References

 Behrens, D.W. & Hermosillo, A. (1980). Eastern Pacific Nudibranchs: A guide to the Opisthobranchs from Alaska to Central America. Sea Challengers, Monterey, California.
 Lance, J. R. (1962) A new Stiliger and a new Corambella (Mollusca: Opisthobranchia) from the northwestern Pacific. The Veliger, 5(1): 33-38, pl. 6.
 Valdes, Angel, & P. Bouchet. (1998) A blind abyssal Corambidae (Mollusca, Nudibranchia) from the Norwegian Sea, with a reevaluation of the systematics of the family. Sarsia, 83(1): 15-20.
 Yoshioka, P.M. (1986). Life history patterns of the dorid nudibranchs Doridella steinbergae and Corambe pacifica. Marine Ecology Progress Series, 31: 179-184.
 Yoshioka, P.M. (1986). Competitive coexistence of the dorid nudibranchs Doridella steinbergae and Corambe pacifica. Marine Ecology Progress Series, 33: 81-88.

External links 
  McDonald, G. R. (2009). Nudibranch Systematic Index, second edition. University of California Santa Cruz: Institute of Marine Sciences

Corambidae
Gastropods described in 1929